100% Fun is the fifth album by alternative rock musician Matthew Sweet. It was released on Zoo Entertainment in 1995.

Release

The album was met with moderate commercial success and favorable reviews. The single "Sick of Myself" reached #2 on the Billboard Modern Rock chart and appeared on the top 100 pop song charts of the day. Critic David Browne of Entertainment Weekly, who included 100% Fun on his year's-best list, wrote in his review that it "makes you feel as if a good pop hook can solve any crisis." The title of the album was derived from Kurt Cobain's 1994 suicide note.

Reissue 
In 2018, independent vinyl reissue label Intervention Records announced that it would be releasing Artist-Approved 2 LP Expanded Editions of 100% Fun, Altered Beast, and Girlfriend. The three albums will also be released on CD/SACD. Intervention also announced a first time on vinyl reissue of Son of Altered Beast.

In Popular Culture
The song "Sick of Myself" was covered by the band Bowling for Soup for their album Bowling for Soup Goes to the Movies.  In 2005, indie rock band Death Cab For Cutie also performed a cover of the song for NPR's World Cafe.

The song "Everything Changes" was featured in the 1995 film The Babysitters Club. It was played during a "tense" moment in the film, went 13-year-old Stacy (one of the main characters, played by a 21-year-old actress) has to come to grips with her anorexia nervosa, as well as get over the 18-year-old she has a crush on. The song plays dramatically after she has lied to her crush about being 18; she and a friend acquire fake ID's and travel to New York City to have a night out with her crush. The fake ID's are embarrassingly confiscated by the doorman at a nightclub;  the two are publicly shamed and sent home from their planned weekend.

"Sick of Myself" appeared on an episode of Hindsight.

Track listing

Personnel
 Matthew Sweet – vocals (1 - 12), electric rhythm guitar (1 - 8, 10 - 12), electric lead guitar (3, 11), acoustic guitar (3, 8, 9), electric bass (1 - 12), piano (2, 9, 11), harpsichord (11), synthesizer (10), theremin (6)
 Robert Quine – electric lead (2, 6, 10) and rhythm (3, 7, 9) guitars
 Richard Lloyd – electric lead (1, 4 - 6, 8) and rhythm (11) guitars
 Greg Leisz – lap (2, 12) and pedal (5, 9) steel guitars, mandolin (8)
 Stuart Johnson – drums (2, 4, 5, 7, 8, 10, 11)
 Ric Menck – drums (1, 3, 6, 9, 12)
 Brendan O'Brien – electric lead (2) and rhythm (1, 10) guitars, acoustic and slide guitars (8), piano (4, 5, 12), mellotron (6), clavinet (7), harpsichord (8)

Charts

References

1995 albums
Matthew Sweet albums
Albums produced by Brendan O'Brien (record producer)
Zoo Entertainment (record label) albums